Kudinilam is a village in the town Thirukkovil of Sri Lanka. It is situated along the eastern coast of the island. It is 2.9:km of Tirukovil and 35.6:km, 33 mins drive north of Pottuvil. It was under Thirukkovil town.

References

External links
 

Villages in Ampara District